Basharyat-e Gharbi Rural District is a rural district (dehestan) in Basharyat District, Abyek County, Qazvin Province, Iran. At the 2006 census, its population was 10,556, in 2,566 families.  The rural district has 17 villages.

References 

Rural Districts of Qazvin Province
Abyek County